Arthur Richard Punshon (1 March 1891 – 20 July 1955) was an Australian rules footballer who played for the South Melbourne Football Club in the Victorian Football League (VFL).

Notes

External links 

1891 births
1955 deaths
Australian rules footballers from Melbourne
Sydney Swans players
People from Williamstown, Victoria